The Batak shrew (Crocidura batakorum) is a species of shrew from the Philippines.

Description
Its dorsal and ventral pelage is dark brown. Its body hairs are uniformly coloured from base to tip.

References

batakorum
Mammals of the Philippines
Mammals described in 2007
Endemic fauna of the Philippines
Fauna of Panay
Fauna of Palawan